The HX Draw is a bascule bridge carrying the New Jersey Transit Bergen County Line and Pascack Valley Line across the Hackensack River between Secaucus, New Jersey and East Rutherford. The bridge is also known as The Jack-Knife because of its unusual method of opening.

Designed by Joseph Strauss and completed in 1911, this bridge is one of the first heel trunnion bascule bridges built in the United States and originally formed part of the Erie Railroad's main line.

In 2008, NJ Transit repainted the span in a new coat of black paint.

See also
Hackensack RiverWalk
Timeline of Jersey City area railroads
List of bridges, tunnels, and cuts in Hudson County, New Jersey
NJT movable bridges

References

External links 
 Movable Railroad Bridges of New Jersey
bridgesnyc.com
NJ bridges
Partial list HC bridges

Bascule bridges in the United States
Railroad bridges in New Jersey
Bridges completed in 1911
Bridges in Hudson County, New Jersey
Bridges in Bergen County, New Jersey
Erie Railroad bridges
NJ Transit bridges
1911 establishments in New Jersey
Bridges over the Hackensack River
Steel bridges in the United States
Warren truss bridges in the United States